The Maguire-Williams House is a historic house at 19105 Arkansas Highway 74 east of Elkins, Arkansas.  It is a -story log and frame structure, finished in wooden clapboards, with a side gable roof.  The house appears to have been built between about 1838 and 1877, and includes a frame addition to the rear and an open porch extending across the width of its front.  The oldest log pen of the structure has been dated by dendrochronology to c. 1838, with a second wood frame pen, in dog trot layout, added c. 1867.  It is one of the county's older antebellum buildings.

The house was listed on the National Register of Historic Places in 1995.

See also
National Register of Historic Places listings in Washington County, Arkansas
List of the oldest buildings in Arkansas

References

Houses on the National Register of Historic Places in Arkansas
Houses completed in 1838
Houses in Washington County, Arkansas
National Register of Historic Places in Washington County, Arkansas
1838 establishments in Arkansas
Dogtrot architecture in Arkansas